The 2011 Nordic Golf League was the 13th season of the Nordic Golf League, one of four third-tier tours recognised by the European Tour.

Schedule
The following table lists official events during the 2011 season.

Order of Merit
The Order of Merit was based on prize money won during the season, calculated using a points-based system. The top five players on the tour (not otherwise exempt) earned status to play on the 2012 Challenge Tour.

See also
2011 Danish Golf Tour
2011 Finnish Tour
2011 Swedish Golf Tour

Notes

References

Nordic Golf League